Paranthias is a genus of marine ray-finned fish, groupers from the subfamily Epinephelinae, part of the family Serranidae, which also includes the anthias and sea basses. They are found in the Atlantic Ocean and the eastern Pacific Ocean.

Characteristics
The species in the genus Paranthias are unique among the groupers in that they have a relatively small mouth, the upper jaw being more protrusible than that of other groupers,s], with small teeth and many elongated gill rakers, and a fusiform body which ends in a deeply forked caudal fin. These departures from the more normal morphology of groupers are adaptations for feeding on zooplankton in open water. They are visual hunters which pick off zooplankton from the middle of the water column and they have a relatively short snout which allows them to employ binocular vision. They are social fish which are normally seen in diurnal feeding aggregations, diving to shelter in the reef when threatened.

Distribution
The two species in the genus Paranthias each occur in different oceans, the creole-fish (P. furcifer) is found mainly in the warmer waters of the western Atlantic Ocean but its range extends to Ascension Island and the islands in the Gulf of Guinea in the eastern Atlantic. The Pacific creole-fish occurs in the tropical and subtropical eastern Pacific Ocean.

Taxonomy
The genus Paranthias was created in 1863 by the American ichthyologist Theodore Nicholas Gill (1837-1914) as a monotypic genus containing only the type species Serranus furcifer and for a long period the Pacific creole-fish was considered conspecific with the creole-fish.

Species
It contains the following species:

Paranthias colonus (Valenciennes, 1846) (Pacific creole-fish)
Paranthias furcifer (Valenciennes, 1828) (Creole-fish)

References

Epinephelini
Taxa named by Alphonse Guichenot